You Yanchun (born 10 February 1976) is a Chinese speed skater. She competed in the women's 1000 metres at the 2002 Winter Olympics.

References

1976 births
Living people
Chinese female speed skaters
Olympic speed skaters of China
Speed skaters at the 2002 Winter Olympics
Sportspeople from Jilin